Lomatium mohavense is a species of flowering plant in the carrot family known by the common name Mojave desertparsley. It is native to southern California with a few outlying populations in Arizona, Nevada and Baja California. It is found in several types of mountain and desert habitat, including chaparral, woodland, and scrub, mostly from  elevation.

Description
Lomatium mohavense is a hairy gray-green perennial herb growing 10 to 40 centimeters tall from an elongated taproot. There is generally no stem, the erect or spreading leaves and inflorescence emerging from ground level. The leaves may approach 20 centimeters long, their blades intricately divided and subdivided into crowded clusters of tiny segments. The inflorescence is an umbel of yellow to brownish to dark purple flowers.

References

External links

Calflora Database: Lomatium mohavense (Mojave desertparsley, Mohave wild parsley, Mojave lomatium)
UC Photos gallery — Lomatium mohavense

mohavense
Flora of California
Flora of Arizona
Flora of Baja California
Flora of the Sonoran Deserts
Flora of the California desert regions
Natural history of the California chaparral and woodlands
Natural history of the Mojave Desert
Natural history of the Peninsular Ranges
Natural history of the Transverse Ranges
Taxa named by John Merle Coulter
Flora without expected TNC conservation status